Atmosphères is a jazz and ambient double studio album by a quartet composed of the pianist Tigran Hamasyan, the trumpeter Arve Henriksen, the guitarist Eivind Aarset and the musician Jan Bang. This album was released in the label ECM Records in September 2016.

Background
The producer, Manfred Eicher had the idea of this quartet with a Deutschlandfunk radio programme, which included an excerpt from a performance at Punkt Festival in Kristiansand, featuring Tigran Hamasyan with Jan Bang, then he brings trumpeter Arve Henriksen and guitarist Eivind Aarset into the project. This album was also made on only three days, and most of the music is improvised.

Reception
Thom Jurek in his review for All Music says that this album is "make for a demanding listen (at least in one sitting). That said, it offers distinctive, illuminating, and abundant rewards to anyone who will encounter it on its own terms."

In The Guardian, John Fordham gave this album three stars and says that "The pairing of Hamasyan and Henriksen, meanwhile, brings an unexpectedly song-based seductiveness to an all-improv session including such hi-tech experimenters as Aarset and Bang."

Track listing
ECM Records – ECM 2414/15.

Personnel
 Tigran Hamasyan – piano
 Arve Henriksen – trumpet
 Eivind Aarset – guitar
 Jan Bang – samples, live sampling

References

ECM Records albums
2016 albums
Albums produced by Manfred Eicher
Tigran Hamasyan albums